The Shangri-La's Far Eastern Plaza Hotel Tainan, is skyscraper hotel completed in 1993 in East District, Tainan, Taiwan. It is one of the earliest skyscrapers in Tainan and as of December 2020, it is still the tallest building in the city.

The lower floors of the building houses the Far Eastern Department Store and the upper floors houses a hotel, which is managed by the Shangri-La Hotels and Resorts. The hotel has a total of 331 rooms and 5 restaurants and bars and is one of the top luxury hotels in Tainan. This is Shangri-La's one of two bases in Taiwan, with the other base being located in Far Eastern Plaza in Taipei.

See also
 Shangri-La Far Eastern, Taipei
 List of tallest buildings in Asia
 List of tallest buildings in Taiwan
 Unique Golden Triangle

References

External links
Shangri-La's Far Eastern Plaza Hotel Tainan Official Website 
Shangri-La's Far Eastern Plaza Hotel Tainan - Tourism Bureau of the Ministry of Transport of the Republic of China 
Shangri-La Hotel Group's Channel-Youku

1993 establishments in Taiwan
Skyscraper hotels in Taiwan
Skyscrapers in Tainan
Tainan
Hotels in Taiwan
Hotels in Tainan